Muhammed Akbar Khan, MBE PA-1 (born 19 April 1897) was a Pakistani general and at the time of the independence of Pakistan, he was the most senior Muslim General. He also served as the first Senior Military Secretary of the Quaid-e-Azam, Muhammed Ali Jinnah. He holds the distinguished honor of being the senior most officer of the Pakistan Army and holds Pakistan Army number PA-1.

Early career
Born on 19 April 1897 to a Minhas Rajput family, Khan enlisted in the Indian Army & the 12th Cavalry 1 May 1914. He was made a Viceroy's Commissioned Officer (VCO) in the rank of Jemadar 1 July 1915. The 12th Cavalry was mobilized for field service in November 1915 and he served in Mesopotamia from 28 November 1915 to 13 September 1917. He was granted a temporary commission in the Indian Army as a second lieutenant on 1 December 1919. He was attached to 40th Cavalry Regiment from 6 January 1920 until 6 January 1921, when, now a lieutenant as of 1 December 1920, he was attached to the 12th Cavalry. On 28 August 1921, the 12th Cavalry amalgamated with the 11th K. E. O. Cavalry to form the 11/12th Cavalry, which was renamed the 5th King Edward's Own Probyn's Horse in July 1922.

Khan was given a permanent commission in the Indian Army as second lieutenant with effect from 17 July 1920. He was also permanently appointed to the 5th King Edward's Own Probyn's Horse from being attached to the regiment. He was promoted captain on 17 July 1927 and from late 1927 to late 1931 he held the appointment of Quarter Master in the regiment. He was appointed a Member of the Order of the British Empire in June 1930. From 1 May 1933 he was posted away from the regiment as Assistant Recruiting Officer, Lahore, a post he held until 30 April 1934. On 11 May 1934 he transferred to the 1st battalion, 14th Punjab Regiment, who he served with on the Mohamand campaign on the North West Frontier in 1935. Whilst serving with them he later became attached to the Royal Indian Army Service Corps, to which he transferred on 5 February 1936.

Khan was promoted to major on 17 July 1938. At the outbreak of World War II he was commanding the 41st Animal Transport Company in France but deployed from Mumbai to Marseilles in December 1939 with 32 Animal Transport Company (Mules) as part of Force K-6, having entrained at Landikotal on 2 December 1939. Later he was to help in the evacuation of troops from Malo-les-Bains.  He was promoted to temporary lieutenant-colonel on 31 October 1942, while serving with the R.I.A.S.C.

On 27 July 1945 he was appointed acting colonel, then on 26 January 1946 promoted temporary colonel, on 17 July 1946 promoted substantive lieutenant-colonel and finally on the 21 December 1946 appointed acting brigadier.

On the creation of Pakistan he was appointed to command Sind Area, later renamed (1 January 1948) 8th Division on 15 August 1947 until 6 December 1950.

Books 
He wrote over 40 books under the name ‘’Rangroot’’, which means private soldier or enlisted man to denote his rise from a modest background, on subjects related to Islam and military strategy, including:
 Ḥadīs-i difāʻ Nabī-ĕ-Akram-ke usva-ĕ-ḥasana-kī rawshanī-meṅ, 1954, 336 p. 
 Māz̤ī, ḥāl aur mustaqbal kā aṣlaḥ jang, 1954, 115 p.
 Hazrat Ali as an Amir, 44 p.
 Krūsaid aur jihād, 1961, 436 p.
 Muhammad Mustafā Kamāl Pasha, 1966, 295 p.
 Turkon ki jidd o jahd-i āzādi, 1966, 4,240 p.
 K̲h̲avātīn-i Islām aur hadīs, 1966, 160 p. 
 The ideologies in conflict, 1967, 217 p.
 On war; the Islamic policy: grand strategy & diplomacy, 1967, 418 p. 
 Guerrilla warfare, its past, present and future; and, Counter guerrilla warfare, 1967, 392 p.
 The choice of the Arabs versus Zionists cult, 1967, 68 p.
 K̲h̲avātīn-i Islām kelie mashʻal-i rāh, 1967, 280 p. 
 Maḥshar-i Falast̤īn, 1968, 244 p.
 Sultan Salahuddin Yousaf Ayubi versus the crusaders, 1968, 437 p.
 Merī āk̲hi̲rī manzil, 2006, 438 p.

References

Further reading
 Pakistan's Drift into Extremism, Hassan Abbas, 2005
 Pakistani Generals, A. K Anwar, 1992
 Meri Akhri Maanzil - Urdu: Akbar Khan, a biography, by Khalid Akbar, 2006. [Khalid Akbar is his son].
 Nationalisation of the Indian Army (1885–1947, Lt.Col.Gautam Sharma
 Memoirs Of Maj Gen A A Rudra, Maj Gen D K Palit

Pakistani generals
Pakistani Members of the Order of the British Empire
Pakistani writers
Indian Army personnel of World War II
People from Chakwal District
Indian Army personnel of World War I
1897 births
British Indian Army officers
Year of death missing